The Archdiocese of Cologne is an archdiocese of the Catholic Church in western North Rhine-Westphalia and northern Rhineland-Palatinate in Germany.

History
At an early date Christianity came to Cologne with the Roman soldiers and traders. According to Irenaeus of Lyons, it was a bishop's see as early as the second century. However, Saint Maternus, a contemporary of Constantine I, is the first historically certain bishop of Cologne. As a result of its favourable situation, the city survived the stormy period around the fall of the Western Roman Empire. When the Franks took possession of the country in the fifth century, it became a royal residence. On account of the services of the bishops to the Merovingian kings, the city was to have been the metropolitan see of Saint Boniface, but Mainz was chosen, for unknown reasons, and Cologne did not become an archbishopric until the time of Charlemagne. The city suffered heavily from Viking invasions, especially in the autumn of 881, but recovered quickly from these calamities, especially during the reign of the Ottonian emperors.

From the mid-13th century, the Electorate of Cologne—not to be confused with the larger Archdiocese of Cologne—was one of the major ecclesiastical principalities of the Holy Roman Empire. The city of Cologne as such became a free city in 1288 and the archbishop eventually moved his residence from Cologne Cathedral to Bonn to avoid conflicts with the Free City, which escaped his jurisdiction.

After 1795, the archbishopric's territories on the left bank of the Rhine were occupied by France, and were formally annexed in 1801. The Reichsdeputationshauptschluss of 1803 secularized the rest of the archbishopric, giving the Duchy of Westphalia to the Landgraviate of Hesse-Darmstadt. As an ecclesial government, however, the archdiocese remained (more or less) intact: while she lost the left bank including the episcopal city itself, Cologne, to the new Diocese of Aachen established under Napoleon's auspices, there still remained a substantial amount of territory on the right bank of the Rhine. After the death of the last Elector-Archbishop in 1801, the see was vacant for 23 years, being governed by vicar capitular Johann Herrmann Joseph v. Caspars zu Weiss and, after his death, by Johann Wilhelm Schmitz. In 1821, the archdiocese regained Cologne and the right bank of the Rhine (though with a new circumscription reflecting the Prussian subdivisions) and, in 1824, an archbishop was established there again. It remains an archdiocese to the present day, considered the most important one of Germany.

Finances
Cologne, the largest (in terms of inhabitants non-Catholics included) and reportedly richest diocese in Europe, announced in October 2013 that "in connection with the current discussion about Church finances" that its archbishop had reserves amounting to 166.2 million Euro in 2012. It said the 9.6 million Euro earnings from its investments were, as in previous years, added to the diocesan budget of 939 million Euro in 2012, three-quarters of which was financed by the "church tax" levied on churchgoers. In 2015 the archdiocese for the first time published its financial accounts, which show assets worth more than £2bn. Documents posted on the archdiocesan website showed assets of €3.35bn (£2.5bn) at the end of 2013. Some € 2.4 billion (£1.8bn) were invested in stocks, funds and company holdings. A further €646m (£475m) were held in tangible assets, mostly property. Cash reserves and outstanding loans amounted to about €287m (£211m).

List of archbishops of Cologne since 1824

The following is a list of the archbishops since the Archdiocese of Cologne was re-filled in 1824.
1824–1835: Ferdinand August von Spiegel
1835–1845: Clemens August von Droste-Vischering
1845–1864: Cardinal Johannes von Geissel
1866–1885: Cardinal Paul Ludolf Melchers
1885–1899: Cardinal Philipp Krementz
1899–1912: Hubert Theophil Simar
1902–1912: Cardinal Anton Hubert Fischer
1912–1919: Cardinal Felix von Hartmann
1920–1941: Cardinal Karl Joseph Schulte
1942–1969: Cardinal Josef Frings
1969–1987: Cardinal Joseph Höffner
1989–2014: Cardinal Joachim Meisner
2014–    : Cardinal Rainer Woelki

References

External links
 List of Bishops and Archbishops of Cologne Archdiocese of Cologne (Erzbistum Köln)
 List of Bishops and Archbishops of Cologne Cologne Cathedral (Kölner Dom)

Christianity in Cologne
Cologne
Cologne Cathedral
Roman Catholic ecclesiastical provinces in Germany